A Belgian bun is a sweet bun containing sultanas and usually topped with fondant icing and half a glace cherry. Some recipes also include lemon curd. The bun is round or square shaped, with rounded off edges, making it similar in appearance to a Chelsea bun. It is also sometimes served with cream. No firm link has so far been established between the bun and Belgium; however, that country does produce as one of its specialties a very similar viennoiserie (though with less icing) known as a  rozijnenkoek or couque suisse.

See also
 List of buns

References

Sweet breads
Buns